Alberto Amodeo (born 7 December 2000) is an Italian Paralympic swimmer. He represented Italy at the 2020 Summer Paralympics.

Career
Amodeo represented Italy in the men's 400 metre freestyle S8 event at the 2020 Summer Paralympics and won a silver medal.

References

External links
 

2000 births
Living people
Italian male freestyle swimmers
Medalists at the World Para Swimming Championships
Medalists at the World Para Swimming European Championships
Paralympic swimmers of Italy
Swimmers at the 2020 Summer Paralympics
Medalists at the 2020 Summer Paralympics
Paralympic silver medalists for Italy
Paralympic medalists in swimming
S8-classified Paralympic swimmers
21st-century Italian people